Alexander "Alec" Lorimer was a Scottish association football half back who played professionally in the American Soccer League.

Lorimer began his career with Hurlford F.C. in the Scotland Western Football League.  He then played one game for Kilmarnock F.C. during the 1920-1921 season.  In 1921, Lorimer left Scotland to join Philadelphia Field Club of the American Soccer League.  Philadelphia won the league title that year.  In August 1922, Lorimer moved to the Fall River Marksmen, playing for them until 1924.  In March 1924, he instigated an altercation with Sturdy Maxwell in the Easter final of the 1923–24 National Challenge Cup.  This led to six-month suspension in national competitions.  In 1925, the Marksmen released Lorimer who moved to the Shawsheen Indians for the start of the 1925-1926 season.  After twenty games, the Indians sent him to the New Bedford Whalers.  Lorimer's lack of discipline followed him and in January 1927, he was fined $50 and suspended for hitting a spectator during a league game.  In 1928, New Bedford sent Lorimer to J&P Coats.   He returned to New Bedford in 1929 and finished his career with them.

External links

References

1896 births
American Soccer League (1921–1933) players
Fall River Marksmen players
J&P Coats players
New Bedford Whalers players
Pawtucket Rangers players
Philadelphia Field Club players
Scottish footballers
Scottish expatriate footballers
Shawsheen Indians players
Year of death missing
Association football forwards
Scottish expatriate sportspeople in the United States
Expatriate soccer players in the United States